The United States National Team Development Program (NTDP) was started in 1996 by USA Hockey as a way to identify elite ice hockey players under the age of 18, and centralize their training. There are two teams in the program: under-17 and under-18. Both teams are based in Plymouth, Michigan. The stated goal of the NTDP is "to prepare student-athletes under the age of 18 for participation on the U.S. National Teams and success in their future hockey careers. Its efforts focus not only on high-caliber participation on the ice, but creating well-rounded individuals off the ice". While enrolled in the NTDP, players stay with billet families.

From its founding until 2014–15, the program was based in Ann Arbor, Michigan, playing games at the Ann Arbor Ice Cube. However, following that season, the Plymouth Whalers of the OHL relocated, freeing up the what was then known as the Compuware Arena. USA Hockey purchased the facility from Peter Karmanos, renamed it the USA Hockey Arena and moved the NTDP to Plymouth.

The under-17 and under-18 teams play games domestically against opponents in the United States Hockey League (under-17 and under-18 teams) and the National Collegiate Athletic Association (under-18 team), as well as three international tournaments for each team plus occasional friendlies. The NTDP teams previously competed in the North American Hockey League until 2009.

Competitive record

World U18 Championship
1999 — 7th place
2000 — 8th place
2001 — 6th place
2002 — 
2003 — 4th place
2004 — 
2005 — 
2006 — 
2007 — 
2008 — 
2009 — 
2010 — 
2011 — 
2012 — 
2013 — 
2014 — 
2015 — 
2016 — 
2017 — 
2018 — 
2019 — 
2020 — Cancelled due to the COVID-19 pandemic
2021 — 5th place
2022 —

Hlinka Gretzky Cup
 
The United States does not send players in the program to this event anymore. It has been non-NTDP players but still Americans.

1991 — 
1992 — 4th place
1993 — 
1994 — 
1995 — 
1996 — 
1997 — N/A
1998 — N/A
1999 — N/A
2000 — 
2001 — 
2002 — 5th place
2003 — 
2004 — 4th place
2005 — 5th place
2006 — 
2007 — 5th place
2008 — 7th place
2009 — 4th place
2010 — 
2011 — 5th place
2012 — 7th place
2013 — 
2014 — 
2015 — 5th place
2016 — 
2017 — 5th place
2018 — 4th place
2019 — 6th place
2020 — Cancelled due to the COVID-19 pandemic
2021 — 5th place

Team

2022–23 under-18 roster
Roster as of September 1, 2022.

|}

2022–23 under-17 roster
Roster as of September 1, 2022.

|}

Record book
Single season
Most goals: Cole Caufield, 72 (2018–19)
Most assists: Jack Hughes, 78 (2018–19)
Most points: Auston Matthews, 117 (2014–15)

Career
Most goals: Cole Caufield, 126 (2017–19)
Most assists: Jack Hughes, 154 (2017–19)
Most points: Jack Hughes, 228 (2017–19)

Notable alumni
As of the 2018–19 season, more than 310 NTDP alumni were drafted in the National Hockey League. This includes Rick DiPietro, Erik Johnson, Patrick Kane, Auston Matthews, and Jack Hughes, all of whom were drafted first overall in the NHL Entry Draft. At the 2007 NHL Entry Draft, NTDP alumni Patrick Kane and James van Riemsdyk were selected 1st and 2nd overall respectively, being the first American-born players selected with the top two picks. A record 17 players selected directly from the NTDP in the 2019 NHL Entry Draft.

References

External links

 

Development Program
USNTDP
USNTDP
Junior national ice hockey teams
USNTDP
1996 establishments in Michigan
Ice hockey clubs established in 1996
Sports in Wayne County, Michigan